San Antonio Creek is a major stream in Los Angeles County and San Bernardino County, California, draining southwards from Mount San Antonio in the San Gabriel Mountains into Chino Creek, a tributary of the Santa Ana River. Upon leaving San Antonio Canyon and entering the broad alluvial plain of the Pomona Valley, it is known as the San Antonio Wash or the San Antonio Creek Channel, the former referring to the creek's seasonal dry nature below the mouth of San Antonio Canyon.

Geography

Course
San Antonio Creek rises on the southeast flank of Mount San Antonio (Mount Baldy), the highest peak in the San Gabriel Mountains range. The stream flows southwest through San Antonio Canyon and past Mount Baldy Village, then south, winding through the Angeles National Forest. At the end of the canyon it reaches the San Antonio Dam, but after passing through the dam, the stream is usually dry. It flows south through a concrete flood control channel, passing through the several cities of the Pomona Valley, including Claremont, Montclair, and Chino.

History
The creek's upper canyon was the site of some of the heaviest gold mining activity in the San Gabriels during the mid-19th century. When the gold deposits petered out, the streambanks played host to various mountain resort camps beginning in the early 20th century. Also around this time, canals were built from the mouth of San Antonio Canyon to irrigate farms in the creek's wide floodplain.

The Los Angeles Flood of 1938 destroyed much of the early development along the creek. The San Antonio Dam was built between 1952 and 1956 by the U.S. Army Corps of Engineers to provide flood control. In recent years, the lower watershed has become much more urbanized, and the headwaters region is mainly used for recreation,  summer hiking and camping, and winter skiing at the Mount Baldy Ski Lifts area.

See also

List of rivers of California

References

Rivers of Los Angeles County, California
Rivers of San Bernardino County, California
Tributaries of the Santa Ana River
Angeles National Forest
Pomona Valley
San Gabriel Mountains
Chino, California
Claremont, California
Montclair, California
Rivers of Southern California